Glykeria Gkatzogianni (born 20 January 1987) is a Greek former footballer who played as a midfielder. She has been a member of the Greece women's national team.

References

1987 births
Living people
Women's association football midfielders
Greek women's footballers
Greece women's international footballers
PAOK FC (women) players